Benjamin Franklin is a 2002 American documentary television series which premiered November 19–20, 2002 and reairs on August 22–September 5, 2005. The series was produced by Twin Cities Public Television of Minneapolis-St. Paul.

Benjamin Franklin won an Emmy for Outstanding Nonfiction Special (Traditional) in 2003. Executive producers Catherine Allan and Jerry Richman accepted the award.

Episode 1     
Let the Experiment Be Made.

His first 47 years, a period that saw the birth of the Enlightenment. Franklin took this intellectual revolution to heart, writing aphorisms based on it for the publication he founded, “Poor Richard's Almanack,” and making significant contributions to his fellow Philadelphians, contributions which included the ideas of public libraries and a volunteer fire department. Richard Easton plays Franklin; Colm Feore narrates.

Episode 2     
The Making of a Revolutionary.

Beginning in 1757, his years in London, sent from Pennsylvania on a mission to allow the colony to tax the Penn family's lands. Franklin arrived as an ardent admirer of the empire as well as a lover of the American colonies (“There's nothing I want more than the prosperity of both,” he says). Seventeen years later, he left—a revolutionary.

Episode 3
The Chess Master.

The final 14 years of his life, nine of which were spent in Paris as ambassador to France from rebellious colonies across the sea. Franklin's primary objective was to secure financial and military aid, far from an easy task. To this he brought the skills of a chess master, able to think many moves ahead in the game.

Cast
 Richard Easton - Benjamin Franklin
 Matthew Bentley - Benjamin Franklin as a child
 Dylan Baker - Benjamin Franklin as a young man
 Colm Feore - Narrator
 Gerry Bamman - Paul Wentworth
 Blair Brown - Jane Franklin
 Kathleen Chalfant - Silence Dogood
 Anthony Cochrane - George III
 John Curless - William Strahan
 Peter Donaldson - John Adams
 Jennifer Dundas - Catherine Ray
 Peter Gerety - Joseph Galloway
 Daniel Gerrol - Joseph Priestley
 Ronald Guttman - Le Comte de Vergennes
 Anthony Heald - Jonathan Austin
 John Christopher Jones - Ephraim Eliot
 Simon Jones - Thomas Penn
 Eddie Korbich - Jared Ruggles
 Roberta Maxwell - Deborah Read Franklin
 Jefferson Mays - Elkanah Watson
 Martin Rayner - Robert Whittington
 Sebastian Roché - Vicomte
 Natacha Roi - Madame Brillon de Joy
 Andrew Seear - British government official
 Josef Sommer - Cotton Mather
 Jim True-Frost - William Franklin
 Laurent St. Pierre - Count de Segur

VHS and DVD Release
Benjamin Franklin is on VHS & DVD.

External links

 
 Benjamin Franklin on PBS

2002 television films
2002 films
American documentary television films
Biographical documentary films
Cultural depictions of Benjamin Franklin
Cultural depictions of John Adams
Cultural depictions of George III
Works about Benjamin Franklin
2000s English-language films
2000s American films